The XXI Corps of the Ottoman Empire (Turkish: 21 nci Kolordu or Yirmi Birinci Kolordu) was one of the corps of the Ottoman Army. It was formed during World War I.

World War I

Order of Battle, August 1917, January 1918, June 1918 
In August 1917, January 1918, June 1918, the corps was structured as follows:

XXI Corps (Gallipoli)
49th Division

Order of Battle, September 1918 
In September 1918, the corps was structured as follows:

XXI Corps (Gallipoli)
49th Division

After Mudros

Order of Battle, November 1918 
In November 1918, the corps was structured as follows:

XXI Corps (Aydın)
58th Division

Sources

Corps of the Ottoman Empire
Military units and formations of the Ottoman Empire in World War I